{{Infobox Boxingmatch
| Fight Name    = Double Trouble
| fight date    = September 10, 2005
| image         = 
| location      = Thomas & Mack Center, Paradise, Nevada, U.S.
| titles        = vacant WBC International super featherweight title
| fighter1      = Manny Pacquiao
| nickname1     = Pac-Man
| record1       = 39–3–2 (32 KO)
| hometown1     = General Santos, Philippines
| height1       = 5 ft 6+1/2 in
|weight1 = 130 lbs
|style1 =Southpaw
| recognition1  = [[The Ring (magazine)|The Ring]] No. 5 ranked pound-for-pound fighter3-division world champion
| fighter2      = Héctor Velázquez 
| nickname2     = Charro Negro (Black Charro)
| record2       = 48–3 (34 KO)
| hometown2     = Tijuana, Baja California, Mexico
| height2       = 5 ft 7 in
|weight2 = 130 lbs
|style2 = Orthodox
| recognition2  = 
| result        = Pacquiao wins via 6th-round TKO
}}
Manny Pacquiao vs. Héctor Velázquez, billed as Double Trouble'', was a super featherweight boxing match. The bout took place on September 10, 2005, at the Staples Center, Los Angeles, California, U.S. as the co-featured bout of the Érik Morales vs. Zahir Raheem fight. Pacquiao won via technical knockout in the sixth round.

Velázquez later on fought Pacquiao's brother, Bobby, and won via disqualification.

References

Velazquez
2005 in boxing
Boxing in Los Angeles
2005 in sports in California
Boxing on HBO
September 2005 sports events in the United States